Culex territans is a species of mosquito in the family Culicidae.

It is widely distributed in Europe. Culex territans is found in central Asia, northern Africa, Canada, and United States.

Accepted Name (and Source)
Culex territans Walker, 1856	
(UKSI)

Synonym (and Source)
Culex apicalis authors, misident.	
(UKSI) 
Culex nematoides Dyar & Shannon, 1925 
(UKSI)

Classification
unranked - Biota

kingdom - Animalia

phylum - Arthropoda

subphylum - Hexapoda

class - Insecta

order - Diptera

infraorder - Culicomorpha

superfamily - Culicoidea

family - Culicidae

genus - Culex

species - Culex territans

Data sets (and Records)

 Mosquito Recording Scheme - Biological Records Centre - (18) 

 Bringing Reedbeds to Life Invertebrate Survey of three key reedbed sites in England in 2009, 2010 - Royal Society for the Protection of Birds (4) 

 BRERC species records from all years at full resolution excluding Notable Species within the last 10 years - Bristol Regional Environmental Records Centre (2) 

 Welsh Invertebrate Database (WID) - Natural Resources Wales (1) 

 Shropshire Ecological Data Network database - Shropshire Ecological Data Network (1)

Ecology 
Culex territans overwinters in adult stage. In northern Europe, overwintering females are found in caves together with Culex pipiens, Culex torrentium, and Culiseta annulata.

Feeding behavior 
The females predominantly feed on amphibians, especially frogs.

References

 Richard F. Jr. Darsie, Ronald A. Ward, Chien C. Chang, Taina Litwak. (2004). Identification and Geographical Distribution of the Mosquitoes: of North America, North of Mexico. University Press of Florida.

Further reading

External links

 Diptera.info

 https://species.nbnatlas.org/species/NBNSYS0000011598#sequences 

 http://vectorbio.rutgers.edu/outreach/species/terr.htm 

 https://www.cabi.org/isc/datasheet/86824 

 https://www.itis.gov/servlet/SingleRpt/SingleRpt?search_topic=TSN&search_value=126501#null 

 https://eol.org/pages/740681 

 https://www.gbif.org/species/1653175 

 http://bioinfo-web.mpl.ird.fr/identiciels/moskeytool_V2/html/taxa/Culex_territans_F_.html 

territans
Insects described in 1856